Minuscule 325 (in the Gregory-Aland numbering), α 111 (Soden), is a Greek minuscule manuscript of the New Testament, on parchment. Palaeographically it has been assigned to the 11th century. 
Formerly it was labelled by 30a, 36p, and 9r. 
It has marginalia.

Description 

The codex contains the text of the New Testament (except Gospels) on 233 parchment leaves with some lacunae. The text is written in one column per page, in 24 lines per page. It begins with text of Acts 15:19, but the text from Acts 15:19 to 2 John was supplied in the 13th century.

It has numerous notes.

The order of books: Acts, 3 John, Jude, Jude, Apocalypse, and the Pauline epistles (as in 175, 336).

Text 

The Greek text of the codex is a representative of the Byzantine text-type. Aland placed it in Category V.

History 

Robert Huntington brought this manuscript from the East to England (along with minuscule 67).
It was used by John Mill (Hunt 1). C. R. Gregory saw the manuscript in 1883.

Formerly it was labelled by 30a, 36p, and 9r. In 1908 Gregory gave the number 325 to it.

The manuscript is currently housed at the Bodleian Library (MS. Auct.E.5.9) at Oxford.

See also 

 List of New Testament minuscules
 Biblical manuscript
 Textual criticism

References

Further reading 

 

Greek New Testament minuscules
11th-century biblical manuscripts